Central California Valley Hydra was an American soccer team that played in Stockton, California. The team joined the USISL in 1994 and moved to the USISL Pro League in 1995. They folded after the 1996 season.

Year-by-year

Coaches
 Greg Petersen: 1994

References

External links
 USISL Standings (1994-1996)

Defunct soccer clubs in California
USISL teams
Soccer clubs in California
1996 disestablishments in California
1994 establishments in California
Association football clubs established in 1994
Association football clubs disestablished in 1996